The Fighting Dems is a nickname given to more than 60 military veterans who ran for Congress as Democrats in the United States' 2006 congressional elections. Five of these candidates were elected to the House of Representatives and one was elected to the Senate. The term  Fighting Dem can be applied to all non-incumbent military veterans running for Congress in 2006 as Democrats.

Other generic names have been used. Mother Jones refers to the group as "The Capitol Brigade". The Draft Zinni campaign describes them as the "Security Dems" and part of the "Blue Force".

Veterans for a Secure America
On December 20, 2005, a group of Fighting Dems met in Washington, D.C. for a strategy session and voted on a name for their coalition: Veterans for a Secure America.  On February 8, 2006, nearly 40 of them met again in Washington to gather outside of the U.S. Capitol.  The event was led by former Senator Max Cleland of Georgia, a Vietnam veteran who with the rest of the veterans chartered the Veterans for a Secure America (VSA). To date the VSA is the only organized group of Fighting Dems though not all Fighting Dems are part of the VSA.

Philosophy

On October 1, 2006, retired Army Major and congressional candidate Tammy Duckworth made the weekly Democratic radio address blasting George W. Bush saying "Instead of a plan or a strategy, we get shallow slogans like 'mission accomplished' and 'stay the course,'" but "Those slogans are calculated to win an election. But they won't help us accomplish our mission in Iraq" She explained that the United States needs "a Congress that will ask the tough questions and work together for solutions rather than attacking the patriotism of those who disagree". Further she said, "It is time to encourage Iraqi leaders to take control of their own country and make the tough choices that will stop the civil war and stabilize the country."

List of Fighting Dems

House races
Candidates, followed by state abbreviation and district number
 Woodrow Anderson III, AR-03. Primary winner.
Ted Ankrum, TX-10. Primary winner.
Dick Auman, IL-16. Primary winner.
Phil Avillo, PA-19. Primary winner.
Lee Ballenger, SC-03 
Rick Bolanos, TX-23. Primary winner.
Bob Bowman, FL-15. Primary winner.
Jim Brandt, CA-46. Primary winner.
Charles Brown, CA-04. Primary winner.
Dave Bruderly, FL-06 Primary winner.
Duane Burghard MO-09. Primary winner.
Chris Carney, PA-10. General election winner
Jack Chagnon, FL-07. Primary winner.
John Courage, TX-21. Primary winner.
Jack Davis NY-26. Unopposed Primary 
Dan Dodd, TX-03. Primary winner.
Andrew Duck, MD-06. Primary winner.
Tammy Duckworth, IL-06. Primary winner.
Bill Durston, CA-03. Primary winner.
Jay Fawcett, CO-05. Primary winner.
William Griffith, SC-04. Primary winner.
David Harris, TX-06. Primary winner.
Tom Hayhurst, IN-03. Primary winner.
Doctor Robert J. Johnson, NY-23 Unopposed Primary
John Laesch, IL-14. Primary winner.
Jim Marcinkowski, MI-08. Primary winner.
Eric Massa, NY-29 Unopposed Primary and in 2008 was elected to Congress.
Patrick Murphy, PA-08. General election winner
Jim Nelson, GA-01. Primary winner.
Dave Patlak,  FL-18th. Primary winner.
John Rinaldi, CA-52. Primary winner.
Joe Roberts, FL-1. Primary winner.
Doctor Arjinderpal Sekhon CA-02. Primary winner.
Joe Sestak, PA-07. General election winner.
Rich Sexton, NJ-03. Primary winner.
Bob Shamansky, OH-12. Primary winner.
Richard Siferd, OH-04. Primary winner.
Dennis Spivack, DE-01. Primary winner.
Charlie Thompson, TX-05. Primary winner.
Tim Walz, MN-01 General election winner
Steve Waterworth IL-18. Primary winner.
Roger Waun, TX-13. Primary winner.
Mike Weaver, KY-02. Primary winner.
Craig Weber, NC-03. Primary winner.
George D. Weber (MO-02) website. Primary winner.
Al Weed, VA-05 See: Virginia U.S. House election, 2006
Bill Winter, CO-06. Primary winner.

Senate races
Jim Webb, Decorated Vietnam War Combat Veteran, Marine, and former Secretary of the Navy who won the Virginia senate race.
Jack Carter, Navy Vietnam War Veteran, ran unsuccessfully for Senate in Nevada. Primary winner.

2006 results
Around 9:20 p.m. on Election Day, Speaker-of-the-House-elect Nancy Pelosi came out and addressed the crowd;

The challengers in the House who managed to defeat their incumbents were Chris Carney (PA-10), Patrick Murphy (PA-08), Joe Sestak (PA-07), and Tim Walz (MN-01).  Additionally, Phil Hare (IL-17) was elected to succeed fellow Democrat Lane Evans.  In the Senate, Jim Webb (VA) was elected. A post-election analysis revealed that while the Democratic veteran candidates were the most salient in 2006, Republican veteran candidates enjoyed higher vote shares that year on average.

See also
 The Veterans’ Alliance for Security and Democracy

References

External links
DNC Fighting Dems website
Veterans for a Secure America — main site
Fighting-Dems.com
Daily Kos articles
Times-Union story
Securing America
VetPAC political action committee
Taking the Hill from the Democratic Party
Profiles of some "Fighting Dems" —  from the Air America Site
Oxford Press (Ohio) article
named on TV
https://web.archive.org/web/20060821042458/http://www.phillyburbs.com/pb-dyn/news/111-06182006-672039.html
https://web.archive.org/web/20060718075712/http://www.cookpolitical.com/races/house/default.php

American military personnel
2006 elections in the United States
Federal elections of the United States
American political candidates